Andreas Stauff (born 22 January 1987) is a German former professional road bicycle racer, who rode professionally between 2007 and 2015. He now works as a directeur sportif for UCI Continental team .

Major results

2009
 Thüringen Rundfahrt der U23
1st Stages 3 & 4
 Tour de l'Avenir
1st Points classification
1st Stage 7
 3rd Sparkassen Giro Bochum
 3rd Schaal Sels-Merksem
2011
 3rd Sparkassen Giro Bochum
2013
 8th Le Samyn
 8th Grand Prix Pino Cerami
2014
 5th Overall World Ports Classic
 9th ProRace Berlin

Grand Tour general classification results timeline

References

External links

1987 births
Living people
People from Frechen
Sportspeople from Cologne (region)
German male cyclists
Cyclists from North Rhine-Westphalia
Directeur sportifs
21st-century German people